An indirect presidential election (officially the 3rd Federal Convention) was held in West Germany on 1 July 1959. For the first time in the Federal Republic, the incumbent president, Theodor Heuss, was not eligible for reelection. In the buildup to the election, Chancellor Konrad Adenauer initially declared his candidacy, but then withdrew for political reasons. The Christian Democratic Union instead nominated Heinrich Lübke. The Social Democrats nominated Carlo Schmid who had been the party's caucus chair at the Parliamentary Council. The Free Democratic Party nominated the chair of its Bundestag caucus, Max Becker. Like the first contested presidential election ten years prior, it took two rounds to determine a winner. Heinrich Lübke fell two votes short of the absolute majority in the first round, winning the election with 526 votes in the second.

Composition of the Federal Convention
The President is elected by the Federal Convention consisting of all the members of the Bundestag and an equal number of delegates representing the states. These are divided proportionally by population to each state, and each state's delegation is divided among the political parties represented in its parliament so as to reflect the partisan proportions in the parliament.

Source: Eine Dokumentation aus Anlass der Wahl des Bundespräsidenten am 18. März 2012

Results

References

1959 in West Germany
1959
July 1959 events in Europe
1959 elections in Germany
Heinrich Lübke